José João Rodriques Pereira, also called João Kik (born October 9, 1981 in Dili, Timor-Leste) is a Timorese footballer. He currently plays for FC Zebra as a midfielder. He was the only Timorese player to score a goal in the 2014 FIFA World Cup qualification.

References

External links

1981 births
Living people
East Timorese footballers
Timor-Leste international footballers
F.C. Porto Taibesi players
A.D. Dili Leste players
People from Dili
Association football forwards